Euphorbia clementii is a herbaceous plant species that occurs on rocky hillsides and stony ground in the Pilbara in Western Australia. It has an erect habit, growing to 60 cm high. The species was first formally described by Czech botanist Karel Domin in 1930 in Bibliotheca Botanica, from plant material collected by Emile Clement between the Ashburton and Yule Rivers. It is classified as "Priority Two - Poorly Known" under the Wildlife Conservation Act in Western Australia.

References

clementii
Eudicots of Western Australia